Momer Alo is a 1964 Bengali film directed by Salil Dutta. The film stars Uttam Kumar and Sabitri Chatterjee in lead roles. It has music composed by Robin Chatterjee.

Synopsis
Deepa a schizophrenic patient loses her normalcy due to a mishap that occurred in her personal life. Dr. Surajit Sen takes this case as a challenge to prove that an injured mind needs more care and a better understanding than any medicine on therapy. The film portrays how the doctor gets intimate with his patient and slowly gets into the detail of her crisis and enables her to lead a normal life.

Cast
 Uttam Kumar - Dr. Surajit Sen
 Sabitri Chatterjee - Deepa
 Lolita Chatterjee - Baruna
 Rishi Banerjee 
 Haradhan Bandyopadhyay - Anant Chatterjee 
 Ardhendu Bhattacharya  
 Geeta Dey - Sukhiya
 Utpal Dutt - Dr. Shome
 Shailen Ganguly 
 Gopal Ghosh
 Rabi Ghosh - Gobardhan
 Robin Majumdar - Pandit Shibshankar
 Subir Sen - Shantanu

Soundtrack

References

External links
 

1964 films
1960s Bengali-language films
Bengali-language Indian films
Films directed by Salil Dutta
Films scored by Robin Chatterjee